Reza Karmollachaab (is an Iranian professional footballer who plays for Iranian club Van Pars as a centre forward.

Foolad 
Karmollachaab started his career with Foolad academy. He was part Foolad U19 during the 2013–14 season.

Naft Masjed Soleyman

2014–15 
In the summer of 2014 he joined the training camp of Persian Gulf Pro League club Naft Masjed Soleyman and signed with the first team at the age of 17. He made his debut for Naft Masjed Soleyman on 25 September 2014 against Rah Ahan as substitute for Milad Jafari. Karmollachaab scored his first senior goal on 11 March 2015 in a 2–2 draw against Persepolis after coming on as a substitute in the 83rd minute.

Mafra 
On 28 January 2016, Karmollachaab joined Portuguese Segunda Liga club Mafra. He was previously linked to Vitória de Setúbal and Sporting CP, but chose to join Mafra for more playing time. Karamollachaab left Mafra at the end of the season after not playing a single minute because of ITC issues.

Persepolis 
After Karmollachaab's departure from Mafra, he signed with Persian Gulf Pro League side Persepolis in June 2016.

International career

Youth
Karmollachaab scored 5 goals for the Iran national under-20 football team during 2016 AFC U-19 Championship qualification.

Club career statistics

Honours
Persepolis
 Persian Gulf Pro League (2): 2016–17, 2017–18

References 

 Reza Karamolachaab :: Reza Karamolachaab :: www.pleymakerstats.com
  12 julay 1997
  profile footballdatabase
 Reza Karmollachaab - Soccer player profile & career statistics - Global Sports Archive 
 معرفی رضا کرملاچعب - مهاجمان فوتبال www.toopball.com
 رضا کرملاچعب به پرسپولیس پیوست | پرسپولیس نیوز perspolisnews.com
Iran - R. Karmollachaeb - Profile with news, career statistics and history - Soccerway". ca.soccerway.com

External links 
 Reza Karmollachaab at Soccerway
 Reza Karmollachaab Profile
 Reza Karamollachaab on Instagram

1997 births
Living people
Iranian footballers
Naft Masjed Soleyman F.C. players
C.D. Mafra players
Persepolis F.C. players
Esteghlal Khuzestan players
Kokkolan Palloveikot players
Sepidrood Rasht players
Persian Gulf Pro League players
Ykkönen players
Iranian expatriate footballers
Iranian expatriate sportspeople in Portugal
Expatriate footballers in Portugal
People from Shushtar
Iran under-20 international footballers
Association football forwards
Sportspeople from Khuzestan province